Drepanulatrix foeminaria is a species of geometrid moth in the family Geometridae. It is found in North America.

The MONA or Hodges number for Drepanulatrix foeminaria is 6686.

References

Further reading

 

Caberini
Articles created by Qbugbot
Moths described in 1858